USS Pierre may refer to:

 , a  that served in the United States Navy in 1943–1958 and named as USS Pierre (PC-1141) in 1956–1958
 , a future 

United States Navy ship names